Following is a list of results of the 2010 Kyrgyzstan League Women season.  Kyrgyzstan League Women is top division of the women's football in Kyrgyzstan. The league is organized by the Football Federation of Kyrgyz Republic and was established in 2005.

References

 
Kyrgyzstan
women